is a Japanese voice actress affiliated with Ken Production.

Filmography

Anime
Ashita no Nadja (Kennosuke Tsurugi)
Beet the Vandel Buster and Beet the Vandel Buster Excellion (Beet)
Bleach (young Renji Abarai in ep 32)
Bobobo-bo Bo-bobo (young Bobobo-bo Bo-bobo, Patchibobo)
Demashita! Powerpuff Girls Z (Shin'ichi, Brick)
Digimon Adventure (Koromon)
Digimon Adventure 02 (Daisuke Motomiya, Anna)
Digimon: Diaboromon Strikes Back (Daisuke Motomiya)
Digimon: The Golden Digimentals (Daisuke Motomiya)
Divergence Eve (Ryer Von Eltiana)
Fullmetal Alchemist (Pharmacist in ep 11, Son in ep 17)
Futakoi (Keisuke Kosaka)
Futari wa Pretty Cure (Kiriya)
Gaiking second series (Puria)
Getbackers (boy in ep 3, mother in ep 2)
Hikarian (Okami)
Hunter X Hunter (Kanaria)
Inuyasha the Movie 4: Fire on the Mystic Island (Roku)
Kamichu! (Tire God, DVD ep 7)Kōchū Ōja Mushiking - Mori no Tami no Densetsu (Chalk)Kinnikuman Nisei (young Checkmate, Tamaki Maekawa)Konjiki no Gash Bell: 101 Banme no Mamono (Makai elementary school student)Major (Natsume)Misaki Chronicles (Ryer Von Eltiana)Ojamajo Doremi (Toyokazu Sugiyama)
One Piece (Young Wiper, Jewelry Bonney [2009-2016])
Pocket Monsters (Piplup)
Samurai Champloo (Obaasan in ep 19, Oryu in ep 4)
Simoun (Anubituf; Child  in ep 26; Child C in ep 22; Cook A in ep 10, 16, 19; Ground Crew in ep 22; Mamina's Father in ep 7; Man A in ep 26; Passenger in ep 2; Priestess B in ep 21; Shoukoku Soldier B in ep 23; Soldier in ep 19; Trainee 3 in ep 3)
Street Fighter Alpha: The Movie (Shun)
The Prince of Tennis (Kevin Smith)
Wings of Rean (Flussul in ep 3)
Yume no Crayon Oukoku (unlisted role)

Drama CD
Dear (Marianne Claybert)

Video games
Halo 2 (Miranda Keyes)
Super Smash Bros. Brawl (Piplup)
Rumble Roses (Aisha / Sista A)
Rumble Roses XX (Aisha / Sista A)
Unlimited Saga (Norff)

Dubbing Roles
Queen Mary (Gunpowder, Treason & Plot)
Stressed Eric (Mrs.Wilson)
The Boondocks (Huey Freeman)

References

External links
Reiko Kiuchi profile at Ken Production 

1968 births
Living people
Voice actresses from Tokyo
Japanese video game actresses
Japanese voice actresses
20th-century Japanese actresses
21st-century Japanese actresses
Ken Production voice actors